Georgian College is a College of Applied Arts and Technology in Ontario, Canada. It has 13,000 full-time students, including 4,500 international students from 85 countries, across seven campuses, the largest being in Barrie.

History
The college was established during the formation of Ontario's college system in 1967. Colleges of Applied Arts and Technology were established on May 21, 1965, when the Ontario system of public colleges was created.

Programs
Georgian College offers academic upgrading, apprenticeship training, certificate, diploma, graduate certificate, college degree and university programs (including combined degree-diplomas) and part-time studies in such areas such as automotive business, business and management, community safety, computer studies, design and visual arts, engineering technology and environmental studies, health, wellness and sciences, hospitality, tourism and recreation, human services, Indigenous studies, liberal arts, marine studies, and skilled trades.

Classes are small (26 people on average).

Georgian offers the following degrees:
 Honours Bachelor of Business Administration (Automotive Management)
 Honours Bachelor of Business Administration (Management and Leadership)
 Honours Bachelor of Business Administration (Golf Management)
 Honours Bachelor of Interior Design
 Honours Bachelor of Police Studies
Bachelor of Science in Nursing (Collaborative Program)
 Honours Bachelor of Counselling and Psychotherapy

Georgian partners with Lakehead University to deliver degree-diploma programs. Students obtain both a diploma and a degree in four years of study. Two of these programs began in September 2017, and two more started in September 2018. Two offer a co-op option. Current Lakehead-Georgian degree-diploma programs are:
 Bachelor of Engineering (Electrical) Degree with Electrical Engineering Technology Advanced Diploma
 Honours Bachelor of Arts and Science – Environmental Sustainability (Specialization in Ecosystem Management) Degree with Environmental Technician Diploma
 Honours Bachelor of Science – Applied Life Sciences (Specialization in Biomedical Techniques) Degree with Biotechnology-Health Diploma
 Honours Bachelor of Science in Computer Science Degree with Computer Programmer Diploma 

Georgian's University Partnership Centre offers a means of earning university degrees, college degrees, combined degree-diplomas and graduate certificate programs.

Degrees currently offered in partnership with other institutions (aside from Lakehead University) include:
Central Michigan University: Master of Arts in education, Community College Concentration
University of Ontario Institute of Technology: RPN-BScN Degree Completion
York University: Bachelor of Science in nursing (Collaborative Program)

The college also currently has more than 780 articulation and transfer agreements with 59 institutions around the world.

Entrepreneurship 
The Henry Bernick Entrepreneurship Centre, at the college's Barrie Campus, assists entrepreneurs in four main areas: training, connections, funding and mentorship.

Georgian also trains students in social entrepreneurship. In 2018 it became the first college in Canada to be designated a "changemaker college" by Ashoka U.

Co-op education 
6,200 employers partner with Georgian to offer student work experiences (such as PowerStream, Algoma Central Corporation, Royal Victoria Regional Health Centre, Magna International, and more).
Georgian was the first Ontario college with programs accredited by Co-operative Education and Work-Integrated Learning Canada; this represents the highest standard of achievement for co-op programs in Canada. Co-op work terms can lead to full-time positions after graduation.
Students may opt to be their own boss and start a business as part of Georgian's eCo-op (entrepreneurship co-op) program.

Georgian has maintained a high graduate employment rate for more than a decade. According to 2019-20 key performance indicators, 90.2% of Georgian graduates found work within six months – well above the provincial average.

Scholarships and bursaries
Georgian offers more than $3 million in bursaries and scholarships to students each year. Students can apply online.

The Government of Canada sponsors an Aboriginal Bursaries Search Tool that lists over 750 scholarships, bursaries, bursaries and other incentives offered by governments, universities and industry to support Aboriginal postsecondary participation. Georgian College scholarships for Aboriginal, First Nations and Métis students include the Casino Rama Aboriginal Tourism Award, Casino Rama Tourism Graduate Award, Monague Native Crafts Ltd. Award, Crossworks Manufacturing Native Education Award, Randy Anderson Memorial Award, New VR Award, Janet Stinson Memorial Award, and Native Education – Community and Social Development Graduate Award.

Campuses

Barrie

Georgian College's main campus is located on a  site on the northeast edge of Barrie.

The Barrie Campus is home to the University Partnership Centre, offering degree studies and combined degree-diploma programs.

The Barrie Campus is also home to the Sadlon Centre for Health, Wellness and Sciences. Opened in 2011, this $65-million,  facility has allowed Georgian to double its enrolment in health and wellness programs to 3,000 students and allow students to pursue health sciences-related certificates, diplomas and degrees, including advanced degree programs. It is home to a variety of health care teaching clinics open to the public, as well as laboratories and classrooms.

The new Peter B. Moore Advanced Technology Centre is a $30-million, 56,000-square-foot facility at the Barrie Campus. It is home to the first engineering degrees in Central Ontario, Lakehead-Georgian degree-diploma programs, and labs with emerging robotics, mechatronics, and manufacturing technology. It has the only anechoic chamber in the region. Students and faculty use the space to partner with industry and community partners on research projects.

Georgian also offers graphic design and photography programs in downtown Barrie, at the Arch and Helen Brown Design and Digital Arts Centre. A bus runs regularly between Georgian's downtown Barrie and north Barrie locations.

The Barrie Campus offers an on-campus residence. The eight-floor residence houses approximately 525 students, which includes 16 live-in residence life staff (15 Resident Attendants and a Manager of Residence Life). There are also two dual bedroom rooms for students with disabilities. During the summer, this residence becomes a summer accommodation facility and hotel, although a few students remain in the building for the summer semester.

Orillia

The Orillia Campus was established in 1969. On-site facilities include a 150-seat theatre, fitness centre and weight room. Over 1,600 students pursue studies at the campus.

Many but not all programs at the Orillia Campus focus on community safety and human services fields. Other programs include Veterinary Assistant and Veterinary Technician, plus numerous graduate certificate programs and part-time offerings.

The campus has an on-site residence housing 192 students in three four-storey buildings. Residence suites accommodate four students with each student having a private bedroom.

Owen Sound

The Owen Sound Campus has over 1,000 full-time students and offers a wide variety of programs, from skilled trades, to early childhood education, to practical nursing.

The campus has an on-site residence that houses 61 students in townhouse-style buildings. Most residence suites accommodate four students with each student having a private bedroom.

Among the most notable features of the campus are its marine training facilities. The Algoma Central Corporation Marine Emergency Duties (MED) Centre, which opened in October 2016 is a $7.5 million, 13,600-square-foot facility and a key part of the college's Marine Studies programs. 

The renovated $8.5-million Centre for Marine Training and Research  is the most technologically advanced marine training centre in the country. The CMTR is used to certify professionals already in the marine industry and to train students in the Marine Engineering Technician and Marine Technology – Navigation programs.  The college also offers a graduate certificate in Marine Engineering Management.

Midland

The Robbert Hartog Midland Campus provides education and training opportunities to North Simcoe County. Campus features include 39,000 square feet of dedicated shop space, Indigenous Resource Centre, a cafeteria, and Recreational Boating Centre of Excellence. It has several hundred full-time students and focuses on skilled trades education including electrical, mechanical, marine engine, welding and plumbing programs.

Muskoka

Campus features include a 7,000-square-foot carpentry shop, computer labs, free parking, multimedia classrooms and videoconferencing capabilities.

South Georgian Bay

The John Di Poce South Georgian Bay Campus, located in Collingwood, Ontario, was established in 1985. Campus features include 20,000 square feet of multi-function classrooms, community room, computer lab, student lounge and videoconferencing capabilities. The campus is easily accessed by municipal transit.

Orangeville

The Orangeville Campus was established in 1988. Campus features include a computer lab, student lounge, videoconferencing capabilities and nursing lab.

Automotive Business School of Canada
Georgian College is also home to the Automotive Business School of Canada, the only one of its kind in the country. The school offers a two-year diploma and a four-year Honours Bachelor of Business Administration degree, specializing in the automotive industry. Students host North America's largest outdoor student-run auto show every year in June.  The Automotive Dealership Management graduate certificate builds on professionals' existing experience and helps them upgrade their skills.

Notable alumni

 Scott Bravener                                 
 Aylan Couchie
 Dale George, industrial designer
 Jon Montgomery, Olympic Gold Medalist (skeleton racing) and television host
 Eve Northmore, founded the Women's Snowboard Federation

See also
 Canadian government scientific research organizations
 Canadian industrial research and development organizations
 Canadian Interuniversity Sport
 Canadian university scientific research organizations
 Higher education in Ontario
 List of colleges in Ontario
 List of universities in Ontario

References

External links

 Georgian College
 Georgian College Library and Academic Success (Library Commons)
 More information on notable alumni, on georgiancollege.ca

1967 establishments in Ontario
Colleges in Ontario
Educational institutions established in 1967
Education in Barrie